Veronika Hyks (born on 21 October 1951) is an English voice over actress and narrator. Hyks is often employed as a voice actress or works as a narrator.

Early life
Hyks was born to Czech parents in the London borough of Westminster. Her family name is Hykšová.

She was a student at the University of Bristol, where she read Drama and Spanish, before graduating in 1974.

Career
She mainly works as a voice-over artist, and works in audio description. She worked as a continuity announcer for Channel 4 in the 1980s. Most of her narration work has been for BBC Two, and more recently BBC Four.

Voice over artist
Productions she has worked for as a narrator include:
 Airline
 Celebrity Fit Club
 Cutting Edge
 Everyman
 Horizon
 Inside Story
 People's Century
 Timewatch
 World in Action
 Breaking the Sound Barrier
 Wild Discovery
 Aristotle Onassis: The Golden Greek

Personal life
She married in 1982 in Westminster and has a daughter.

See also
 Continuity announcers in the United Kingdom

References

External links
 

1951 births
Living people
Alumni of the University of Bristol
Channel 4 people
English people of Czech descent
English voice actresses
Horizon (British TV series)
Radio and television announcers
People from Westminster
Actresses from London
BBC people